Serkin ( or ) is a surname. Notable people with the surname include: 

Peter Serkin (1947–2020), American classical pianist, son of Rudolf
Rudolf Serkin (1903–1991), Bohemian-born American pianist